City and East is a constituency represented in the London Assembly. Created in 2000 it is represented by Unmesh Desai, of the Labour Party. 

Previously, it was represented by John Biggs until 2016.

Boundaries
It consists of the combined area of the London Borough of Barking and Dagenham, the City of London, the London Borough of Newham, and the London Borough of Tower Hamlets.

Assembly Members

Mayoral election results 
Below are the results for the candidate which received the highest share of the popular vote in the constituency at each mayoral election.

Overlapping constituencies
The City and East Assembly constituency comprises all of the following UK Parliament constituencies:

Barking (Labour)
Bethnal Green and Bow (Labour)
East Ham (Labour)
Poplar and Limehouse (Labour)
West Ham (Labour)

It also includes parts of the following constituencies:
Cities of London and Westminster (Conservative) 
Dagenham and Rainham (Labour)

Assembly election results

References

London Assembly constituencies
Politics of the City of London
Politics of the London Borough of Barking and Dagenham
Politics of the London Borough of Newham
Politics of the London Borough of Tower Hamlets
2000 establishments in England
Constituencies established in 2000